Cherry Blossom Love Affair is the fifth studio album from the Malaysian rock band Pop Shuvit, released in 2011 by their own record label, Shuvit Management. This was their last studio album before hiatus.

Album title
The album title, which reads ‘CHERRY BLOSSOM LOVE AFFAIR’ in capital letters, in which the words "Cherry" and "Love Affair" in white color, while the word "Blossom" in red color. The album title was present in the cover, however, the Pop Shuvit name was not present.

Track listing

Personnel
 Moots! - vocals
 JD - guitars
 AJ - bass
 Rudy - drums
 DJ Uno - turntables

References

External links
 Cherry Blossom Love Affair at AllMusic

2011 albums
Pop Shuvit albums